BRCA2 and CDKN1A-interacting protein is a protein that in humans is encoded by the BCCIP gene.

This gene product was isolated on the basis of its interaction with BRCA2 and p21 proteins. It is an evolutionarily conserved nuclear protein with multiple interacting domains. The N-terminal half shares moderate homology with regions of calmodulin and M-calpain, suggesting that it may also bind calcium. Functional studies indicate that this protein may be an important cofactor for BRCA2 in tumor suppression, and a modulator of CDK2 kinase activity via p21. Several transcript variants encoding different isoforms have been described for this gene.

Interactions
BCCIP has been shown to interact with BRCA2, P21, and PTPmu (PTPRM)

References

External links

Further reading